Little Comberton is a small village in Worcestershire, England.

Little Comberton has a village website: www.little-comberton.com.

Villages in Worcestershire